Middle Gujarati (AD 1500–1800), split off from Rajasthani, and developed the phonemes ɛ and ɔ, the auxiliary stem ch-, and the possessive marker -n-. Major phonological changes characteristic of the transition between Old and Middle Gujarati are:
i, u develop to ə in open syllables
diphthongs əi, əu change to ɛ and ɔ in initial syllables and to e and o elsewhere
əũ develops to ɔ̃ in initial syllables and to ű in final syllables

These developments would have grammatical consequences. For example, Old Gujarati's instrumental-locative singular in -i was leveled and eliminated, having become the same as Old Gujarati's nominative/accusative singular in -ə.

References

Gujarati language
Cultural history of Gujarat
Indo-Aryan languages
Languages attested from the 15th century